Oxford Blue is the official colour of the University of Oxford. The official Oxford branding guidelines set its definition as Pantone 282, equivalent to the hex code #002147.

With a hue code of 212, this colour is a very dark tone of azure.

Usage
Oxford Blue stems from the University of Oxford's combined-colleges (whole-university) leading sport teams, thus including Oxford Blues (first sides) and Half-Blues (second sides). In UK rowing, blades consisting only of that colour are used only by these two sides. However it is used in combination with other colours on the blades of Ardingly, Bristol Ariel, City of Oxford, Isle of Ely, Sudbury, Torquay, and Hatfield College (Durham) clubs, Dragon School (Oxford), and by various Oxford colleges, most notably Oriel and Green Templeton. The colour (or a very close variant said to be the same) is used by the Toronto Argonauts of the Canadian Football League; Wycombe Wanderers F.C.; and universities commonly known as Toronto; Penn State; Georgetown; Michigan (as to many athletics teams); and Berkeley.

Origin
The colour was originally chosen by Charles Wordsworth and Thomas Garnier, two members of the 1829 Boat Race crew using "the Christ Church guernsey as our pattern (four of the crew being Christ Church men), only with a broader and darker blue, instead of black stripe. Hence the origin of the 'Dark Blues'." The colour itself is said to have been borrowed from Harrow Blue, as Charles Wordsworth and Charles Merivale, the creators of The Boat Race, attended Harrow School. Similarly, Cambridge Blue is said to have derived from Eton blue.

See also 
 Blue (university sport)
 Blue (university sport)#University of Oxford
 Cambridge Blue (colour)
 Palatinate (colour)
 List of colours

References

Shades of blue
School colors
Terminology of the University of Oxford